Ittikhat (İttixat) is a rural locality (a village) in Kalininsky Selsoviet, Bizhbulyaksky District, Bashkortostan, Russia. The population was 284 as of 2010. There are 3 streets.

Geography 
Ittikhat is located 28 km northeast of Bizhbulyak (the district's administrative centre) by road. Usak-Kichu is the nearest rural locality.

References 

Rural localities in Bizhbulyaksky District